Vasiliy Mailov (born 12 March 1976) is a Russian sprint canoer who competed in the late 1990s. He won a silver medal in the C-4 1000 m event at the 1998 ICF Canoe Sprint World Championships in Szeged.

References

Living people
Russian male canoeists
ICF Canoe Sprint World Championships medalists in Canadian
1976 births